Big Spring Creek Falls is a three-tiered waterfall along Big Spring Creek, originating high on Mount Adams, with a total height of . Its main drop is  feet. It cascades down among a dark forest, surrounded by mosses and ferns. The falls are located within eyesight of Forest Route 23, and is a popular stop for travelers passing by, heading to the Midway High Lakes Area and Takhlakh Lake from Trout Lake or the Lewis River. The falls is managed by the Gifford Pinchot National Forest.

See also 
Waterfalls
Midway High Lakes Area

References

External links 
 BIG SPRING CREEK FALLS 

Landforms of Skamania County, Washington
Waterfalls of Washington (state)
Gifford Pinchot National Forest
Mount Adams (Washington)
Midway High Lakes Area
Tourist attractions in Skamania County, Washington
Tiered waterfalls
Waterfalls of Skamania County, Washington